Victoria v Commonwealth (1971) 122 CLR 353, commonly referred to as the Payroll Tax Case, was a case decided in the High Court of Australia regarding the scope of the Commonwealth's taxation power and the extent to which it can burden a state's structural integrity.

Background
The Commonwealth passed the Payroll Tax Act, which imposed a 2.5% tax on all wages paid by an employer. It also applied to all state employers.

The Act was challenged on the grounds that it breached the Melbourne Corporation principles limiting the extent to which the Commonwealth can burden states.

Decision
The court held that the Act was a valid one under the 'Melbourne Corporation' two-limbed principle. The majority spoke about the implications that could be drawn from the constitution. This came from the fact that the constitution contemplates the existence of the states. A law that fundamentally restricts their exercise of essential functions would go against the implication of the continued existence of the states.

Windeyer J notes that the increased entry of the Commonwealth in areas of concurrent federal and state power was foreseen early on, and the progressive increased fiscal power of the Commonwealth was indicative of this notion. The states in the process of Federation agreed willingly to become a single federal entity giving up some of their powers without gaining any new ones. The gradual centralisation of power in the Commonwealth grew from this process. This view is particularly persuasive in the environment after Engineers which swept away reserved State powers and the doctrine of intergovernmental immunity.

See also 

 Australian constitutional law

References 

 Winterton, G. et al. Australian federal constitutional law: commentary and materials, 1999. LBC Information Services, Sydney.

External links 
 Full text of the decision

High Court of Australia cases
1971 in Australian law
Australian constitutional law
Intergovernmental immunity in the Australian Constitution cases
1971 in case law